Justice Lewis may refer to:

Charles Lundy Lewis (1852–1936), associate justice of the Minnesota Supreme Court
Clive Lewis (judge) (born 1960), judge of the High Court of Justice of England
David Lewis (Indiana judge) (1909–1985), associate justice of the Indiana Supreme Court
Edward Augustus Lewis (1820–1889), associate justice of the Supreme Court of Missouri
Edmund H. Lewis, chief judge of the New York Court of Appeals
Ellis Lewis, associate justice and chief justice of the Supreme Court of Pennsylvania
Henry T. Lewis, associate justice of the Supreme Court of Georgia
James F. Lewis (1836–1886), associate justice of the Supreme Court of Nevada
James Woodrow Lewis, chief justice of the South Carolina Supreme Court
Johnnie Lewis (1946–2015), chief justice of Liberia
Joshua Lewis (judge), one of three judges of the Superior court of the Territory of Orleans
Lunsford L. Lewis, associate justice of the Supreme Court of Virginia
R. Fred Lewis, associate justice of the Supreme Court of Florida
Rhoda Valentine Lewis, associate justice of the Supreme Court of Hawaii
Theodore G. Lewis, associate justice of the Wisconsin Supreme Court
Walter Lewis (judge) (1849–1930), chief justice of British Honduras